The Faraday Lectureship Prize, previously known simply as the Faraday Lectureship, is awarded once every two years (approximately) by the Royal Society of Chemistry for "exceptional contributions to physical or theoretical chemistry". Named after Michael Faraday, the first Faraday Lecture was given in 1869, two years after Faraday's death, by Jean-Baptiste Dumas. As of 2009, the prize was worth £5000, with the recipient also receiving a medal and a certificate. As the name suggests, the recipient also gives a public lecture describing his or her work.

Winners
Source: RSC

See also

 List of chemistry awards

References

External links 

Awards established in 1869
Awards of the Royal Society of Chemistry

1869 establishments in the United Kingdom